Vincent James McMahon (July 6, 1914 – May 24, 1984), sometimes referred to as Vince McMahon Sr., was an American professional wrestling promoter. He is best known for running the Capitol Wrestling Corporation, which was later renamed WWWF (World Wide Wrestling Federation) and WWF (World Wrestling Federation) during his tenure and is currently called WWE (World Wrestling Entertainment), from 1953 to 1982, as well as for being the father of his successor, Vincent K. McMahon.

Early life
Vincent James McMahon was born on July 6, 1914, in Harlem, New York to Rose (née Davis) and Roderick James "Jess" McMahon, a successful boxing, wrestling and concert promoter, who had worked with legendary Madison Square Garden promoter Tex Rickard. His parents were both of Irish descent. He had an older brother, Roderick James Jr., and a younger sister, Dorothy.

Professional wrestling 
McMahon saw the tremendous potential for growth that the pro wrestling industry had in the era following World War II, especially with the development of television and its need for new programming. Similar to boxing, wrestling took place primarily within a small ring and could be covered adequately by one or two cameras, and venues for it could readily be assembled in television studios, lessening production costs.

McMahon's group, the Capitol Wrestling Corporation, which was later renamed World Wide Wrestling Federation (WWWF) and the World Wrestling Federation (WWF), came to dominate professional wrestling in the 1950s and 1960s in the nation's most populous area, the Northeast. His control was primarily in Baltimore, New York, and New Jersey. Despite its name, the WWWF was, like all professional wrestling promotions of that era, mostly a regional operation. It was however the one that came to dominate the most lucrative region. In 1956, McMahon began airing his matches on television on Wednesday nights on the DuMont Network. The telecast originated from an old barn in Washington, D.C. It was one of the struggling network's last live sports telecasts before it went out of business the following year; however, WABD, DuMont's flagship station in New York (Now Fox-owned WNYW), kept the show after becoming an independent station, airing wrestling on Saturday nights until 1971.

In her biography, wrestler The Fabulous Moolah claimed that McMahon was one of the first promoters to split gate proceeds with his wrestlers. Unlike his son, McMahon believed that the job of a promoter should be kept backstage or behind the scenes and should never interfere with the action in the ring. As a result, McMahon almost never came down to the squared circle. He can however clearly be seen standing ringside during the infamous Madison Square Garden "Alley Fight" between Sgt. Slaughter and Pat Patterson. Though McMahon appeared in the movie The Wrestler in a cast that was dominated by contemporary wrestlers, he believed that wrestlers should remain wrestlers and not branch off into other forms of media. Accordingly, he disapproved of Hulk Hogan's appearance in Rocky III in 1982, leading to Hogan's temporary departure from the WWF for Verne Gagne's American Wrestling Association. When his son purchased the WWF, he felt differently than his father on the issue. He rehired Hogan as his top star and avidly supported wrestlers branching out into other fields, as well as cross-promotions with various musicians, actors, and other personalities outside of wrestling.

In 1982, McMahon sold the parent company of the World Wrestling Federation to his son Vince McMahon and his company Titan Sports, Inc. His son, much to his father's initial concern, set out to make the WWF national and eventually worldwide in scope. "Had my father known what I was going to do", the younger McMahon told Sports Illustrated in 1991, "he never would have sold his stock to me." The younger McMahon's competitive tactics were successful, and the WWF quickly became the most prominent exponent of "sports entertainment". His son Vince was running his father's promotion, which since 2002 has been called World Wrestling Entertainment (WWE). McMahon's grandchildren Shane and Stephanie also work for the WWF/E. McMahon was posthumously inducted into the WWF Hall of Fame Class of 1996, by his grandson, Shane.

Personal life and death
McMahon had two sons with his first wife, Victoria "Vicky" H. Askew (née Hanner) (July 11, 1920 – January 20, 2022): Roderick James "Rod" McMahon III (October 12, 1943 – January 20, 2021), and Vince McMahon (born August 24, 1945). McMahon married his second wife, Juanita Wynne Johnston (December 20, 1916 – January 19, 1998), and the couple retired to Fort Lauderdale. McMahon would not live to see his company grow from a territorial promotion to what is now a worldwide organization. On May 24, 1984, McMahon died at age 69 from pancreatic cancer. McMahon and his wife Juanita are buried at Our Lady Queen of Heaven Catholic Cemetery in Fort Lauderdale, Florida.

Awards and accomplishments 
Madison Square Garden
Madison Square Garden Hall of Fame (Class of 1984)
Professional Wrestling Hall of Fame and Museum
Class of 2004
World Wrestling Federation
WWF Hall of Fame (Class of 1996)
Wrestling Observer Newsletter
Wrestling Observer Newsletter Hall of Fame (Class of 1996)

References

Sources
 
 
  (via Google Books)

External links

 
"Vince McMahon: The Tradition Lives On"
 

1914 births
1984 deaths
20th-century American businesspeople
American sports businesspeople
American people of Irish descent
Professional Wrestling Hall of Fame and Museum
WWE Hall of Fame inductees
Deaths from pancreatic cancer
Deaths from cancer in Florida
Professional wrestling promoters
McMahon family